Lockdown Sessions is the fifteenth studio album by Lara Fabian. The album was released on December 16, 2020, only available through her website.

Background
As the world entered a new shade of darkness, Fabian imagined a creative way to keep on growing flowers from the inside. "Lockdown Sessions" was a time for Fabian to explore and unlock a new way of writing, singing and making music. Instead of plunging into despair, she sat silent and navigated to the deepest corners to create these peculiar musical experiments.

Track listing

References

2020 albums
Lara Fabian albums